Dolichoderus laminatus is a species of ant in the genus Dolichoderus. Described by Mayr in 1870, the species is endemic to many North and South American countries.

References

Dolichoderus
Hymenoptera of North America
Hymenoptera of South America
Insects described in 1870